The fifth Annual Pop Corn Music Awards in 1995, at the Aliki Theatre, in Athens, Greece. The awards recognized the most popular artists and albums in Greece from the year 1995 as voted by readers of Greek music publication Pop Corn. The ceremony was hosted by Apostolos Gletsos and Natalia Germanou. The Pop Corn Music Awards were discontinued in 2002.

Performances

Winners and nominees

References 

1995
1995 music awards